Lovers of Toledo is a 1953 historical film directed by Henri Decoin and Fernando Palacios and starring Alida Valli, Pedro Armendáriz and Françoise Arnoul. It was a co-production between France, Italy and Spain.

Partial cast
 Alida Valli as Doña Inés de Arévalo Blas  
 Pedro Armendáriz as Don Alvaro Blas Basto y Mosquera  
 Françoise Arnoul as Sancha  
 Gérard Landry as Fernando de la Cierva  
 Marisa de Leza as Isabella  
 José Sepulveda as Ricardo
 Rafael Bardem as Don Jaime de Arévalo
 Ricardo Calvo as Don José  
 José Isbert as Anticuario  
 Manuel Requena as Mesonero
 Manuel Aguilera as Oficial 
 Beni Deus as Marcos 
 María Francés as Mujer del pueblo  
 Manrique Gil as Relator 
 Casimiro Hurtado as Carpintero  
 Manuel Kayser as Padre confesor 
 José María Lado as Verdugo  
 Nati Mistral as Gitana 
 Santiago Rivero as Policía

References

Bibliography 
 Rège, Philippe. Encyclopedia of French Film Directors, Volume 1.  Scarecrow Press, 2009.

External links 
 

1953 films
French historical drama films
Italian historical drama films
Spanish historical drama films
1950s historical drama films
1950s French-language films
Films based on works by Stendhal
Films directed by Henri Decoin
Films set in the 19th century
Films set in Spain
Films scored by Jesús García Leoz
Lux Film films
1953 drama films
French black-and-white films
Italian black-and-white films
Spanish black-and-white films
1950s Spanish films
1950s Italian films
1950s French films